Heineken may refer to:

 Heineken, pale lager beer, the main product of Heineken International
 Heineken N.V., Netherlands based brewing company
 Heineken Asia Pacific
 Heineken Hungária
 Heineken Lanka
 Heineken Laos
 Heineken Nalaysia
 Heineken Srbija
 Heineken brands, beer produced by Heineken International
 Heineken Oud Bruin, oud bruin beer
 Heineken Premium Light, low alcohol beer

Sport
 Heineken Cup, Rugby union competition
 Heineken Open (tennis), New Zealand tennis tournament
 Catalan Open, former golf tournament known as the Heineken Open
 Holland Heineken House, a Dutch meeting place during the Olympic Games
 Heineken (yacht), a yacht

Other uses
 Heineken (surname)
 Heineken Music Hall, music venue in Amsterdam, Netherlands
 Dr A.H. Heineken Prize